The Listening Sessions was the debut concert tour by American singer Ariana Grande. The tour supported Grande's debut studio album, Yours Truly (2013), which was released September 3, 2013. The tour began on August 11, 2013 and concluded September 22, 2013 and showcased all of the material from Grande's debut studio album, with the exception of "Popular Song". The tour grossed $800,000 from 11 shows across North America. The tour was said to expand after the release of Yours Truly, but failed to materialize due to Grande's filming schedule for Sam & Cat and recording sessions for her second studio album, My Everything.

Background 
On July 15, 2013, the same day that "Baby I" was announced, Grande announced that she would be going on her debut concert tour in August of that year. Grande said she chose the name "The Listening Sessions" because she would only be playing a handful of small intimate venues and fans would be hearing the music from the album before it was released.
Pre-sale tickets went on sale on Thursday, July 18. Regular tickets went on sale on Friday, July 19, 2013. Pre-sale tickets had to be taken down early, as they were selling at such a fast rate that the tour was almost sold out before regular tickets were available.

Set list 
This set list is representative of the show on August 17, 2013. It does not represent all concerts for the duration of the tour.

 "Baby I"
 "Lovin' It"
 "You'll Never Know"
 "Honeymoon Avenue"
 "Tattooed Heart"
 "Better Left Unsaid"
 "Daydreamin'"
 "Almost Is Never Enough"
 "Piano"
 "Right There"
 "The Way"

 During the performance in Los Angeles, Grande was joined by Big Sean to perform their song "Right There", while Mac Miller also assisted Grande in performing "The Way".
 During the performance in New York City, Grande performed an unreleased song entitled "Higher".
 During the performances in Toronto, Rosemont, and Royal Oak, Grande was joined by Nathan Sykes to perform their duet "Almost Is Never Enough".

Shows

References

2013 concert tours
Ariana Grande concert tours
Concert tours of North America
Concert tours of the United States
Concert tours of Canada